Classified advertising is a form of advertising, particularly common in newspapers, online and other periodicals, which may be sold or distributed free of charge. Classified advertisements are much cheaper than larger display advertisements used by businesses, although display advertising is more widespread. They were also commonly called "want" ads, starting in 1763, and are sometimes called small ads in Britain.

Newspaper classifieds 

Advertisements in a newspaper are typically short, as they are charged for by the line or word, and are one newspaper column wide.

Publications printing news or other information often have sections of classified advertisements; there are also publications that contain only advertisements. The advertisements are grouped into categories or classes such as "for sale—telephones", "wanted—kitchen appliances", and "services—plumbing", hence the term "classified". Classified ads generally fall into two types: individuals advertising sales of their personal goods, and advertisements by local businesses. Some businesses use classified ads to hire new employees.

One issue with newspaper classified advertising is that it does not allow images, even though display ads, which do allow images, can be found in the classified section.

Developments 
In recent years the term "classified advertising" or "classified ads" has expanded from merely the sense of print advertisements in periodicals to include similar types of advertising on computer services, radio, and even television, particularly cable television but occasionally broadcast television as well, with the latter occurring typically very early in the morning hours.

Like most forms of printed media, the classified ad has found its way to the Internet, as newspapers have taken their classified ads online and new groups have discovered the benefits of classified advertising.

Internet classified ads do not typically use per-line pricing models, so they tend to be longer. They are also searchable, unlike printed material, tend to be local, and may foster a greater sense of urgency as a result of their daily structure and wider scope for audiences. Because of their self-regulatory nature and low cost structures, some companies offer free classifieds internationally. Other companies focus mainly on their local hometown region, while others blanket urban areas by using postal codes. Craigslist.org was one of the first online classified sites, and has grown to become the largest classified source, bringing in over 14 million unique visitors a month according to Comscore Media Metrix. The sex ad section of the site was probed by authorities until it was shut down indefinitely. A growing number of sites and companies have begun to provide specialized classified marketplaces online, catering to niche market products and services, such include boats, pianos, pets, and adult services, amongst others. In many cases, these specialized services provide better and more targeted search capabilities than general search engines or general classified services can provide. Facebook marketplace provides classified-style services but prohibits the sale of firearms. Other online classified ads websites now exist, Gumtree and Preloved are well known examples. A relatively new entry to this group is Little Breeders Pet Portal that provides its services to UK residents.

A number of online services called aggregators crawl and aggregate classifieds from sources such as blogs and RSS feeds, as opposed to relying on manually submitted listings.

Additionally, other companies provide online advertising services and tools to assist members in designing online ads using professional ad templates and then automatically distributing the finished ads to the various online ad directories as part of their service. In this sense these companies act as both an application service provider and a content delivery platform. Social classifieds is a growing niche.

Statistics 
In 2003 the market for classified ads in the United States was $15.9 billion (newspapers), $14.1 billion (online) according to market researcher Classified Intelligence. The worldwide market for classified ads in 2003 was estimated at over $100 billion. Perhaps due to the lack of a standard for reporting, market statistics vary concerning the total market for internet classified ads. The Kelsey Research Group listed online classified ads as being worth $13.3 billion, while Jupiter Research provided a conservative appraisal of $2.6 billion  and the Interactive Advertising Bureau listed the net worth of online classified revenue at $2.1 billion .

Newspaper's revenue from classifieds advertisements is decreasing continually as internet classifieds grow. Classified advertising at some of the larger newspaper chains dropped by 14% to 20% in 2007, while traffic to classified sites grew by 23%.

As the online classified advertising sector develops, there is an increasing emphasis toward specialization. Vertical markets for classifieds are developing quickly along with the general marketplace for classifieds websites. Like search engines, classified websites are often specialized, with sites providing advertising platforms for niche markets of buyers or sellers.

See also

 Classified magazine
 Newspaper display advertising
 Personal advertisement
 Secondhand good
 Tradio

References

Advertising publications by format